Leland Chancy Croft (born August 21, 1937) is a workers' compensation attorney and Democratic Party politician from the U.S. state of Alaska.  Elected to the Alaska House of Representatives in 1968, he served a single term from 1969 to 1971.  He was then elected to the Alaska Senate, serving in that body from 1971 to 1979, including serving as the president of the Senate from 1975 to 1977 during the 9th Alaska State Legislature.

Facing reelection in his downtown Anchorage-area district in 1978, he instead ran for governor of Alaska.  Winning the Democratic nomination in the primary election over two challengers, he would become the first of 3 major party nominees in Alaska gubernatorial elections to place third in the general election.  The 1978 gubernatorial election was dominated by Republican challenger Walter Hickel.  Hickel lost the primary to incumbent Jay Hammond by 98 votes, then launched a write-in campaign, which outpolled Croft in the general election.

Croft largely retired from electoral politics after this campaign, but continues to practice law and remains prominent in legal and political circles in Alaska.  He served a term on the University of Alaska Board of Regents from 1995 to 2003, including as chair of the body from 2001 to 2002.  His older son, Eric, has gone on to have his own political career.

Early life
Leland Chancy Croft was born in Jennings, Louisiana on August 21, 1937, the son of Leland Croft, an oil and gas landman and geologist, and Dorthy (née Chancy) Croft, a violin teacher.  He grew up in Odessa, Texas, where he graduated high school.  He graduated from the University of Texas at Austin with baccalaureate degrees in government and sociology, as well as a law degree.

Not long after arriving in Anchorage from Texas in 1962, Croft became a charter member of the Alaska Legal Services Corporation, serving as chairman of the Board of Governors from 1971 to 1978.

Political career
Chancy Croft was elected to the Alaska House of Representatives in 1968, serving a single term.   He was then elected to the Alaska Senate in 1970, serving from 1971 until 1979.  He served as Senate President from 1975 to 1977.

He was the Democratic Party's nominee for Governor of Alaska in 1978.  Croft won the nomination over Jalmar M. Kerttula and Ed Merdes;  both had served in the Senate themselves.  Croft was paired with lieutenant gubernatorial nominee Katie Hurley.  Hurley, as Katherine T. Alexander, was a government official in the latter days of the Territory of Alaska, who married Alaska constitution signer James J. "Jim" Hurley in 1960 and settled in his home area, the Matanuska-Susitna Valley.  While still involved in Democratic Party politics, Hurley was largely out of the public eye at that point, busy raising her daughters in Wasilla.

Croft's campaign would be the first of three times in Alaska gubernatorial elections that the major party nominee came in third in the general election.  The campaign was overshadowed by the aftermath of the Republican primary between incumbent Jay Hammond and former governor Walter Hickel. Hickel lost the primary by 98 votes, and after an extensive court challenge, launched a write-in campaign.  Both Hammond (who won reelection) and Hickel outpolled Croft in the general election.

He was a member of the University of Alaska Board of Regents from 1995 until 2003; he was chairman from 2001 to 2002. He has worked to provide educational service to rural Alaska communities while guiding the university toward increased distance delivery education. He is responsible for establishing the Regents Scholarship benefiting UA junior, senior and graduate students. Croft holds an Honorary Doctor of Law from the University of Alaska Anchorage.

Legal career
Chancy Croft has appeared before the Alaska Supreme Court in over sixty cases, winning two-thirds of those cases. In at least twelve cases, he has lost to the Alaska Workers Compensation Board and in the Alaska Superior Court, only to succeed in the Supreme Court. He practices with The Croft Law Office, located in an older downtown Anchorage office building near the Conoco-Phillips Building.

In 1986, his article, Something More Important Than Money: Vocational Rehabilitation in Workers Compensation Cases, was published in the Alaska Law Review.  The article lauded the Alaska statute providing injured workers with training for new careers. The legislature promptly repealed the statute. More recently he unsuccessfully worked with the legislature on potential changes to the Alaska Workers Compensation Act. In 2005, he sued the governor of Alaska, challenging the constitutionality of legislation which created a new executive court to hear appeals from decisions of the Alaska Workers Compensation Board.

Personal life
Leland Chancy Croft is commonly known by his middle name, which is also his mother's maiden name.  His oldest child, Eric (see below), bears the same middle name.

He is married to Antoinette Ruth "Toni" (née Williamson) Croft, a graduate of Stanford University. His children are Eric, Kymberly and Lee. Eric's own career in politics would also include serving in the legislature and running for governor.  He additionally ran for mayor of Anchorage. Eric works with his father at The Croft Law Office. His sister, Dona Lee Croft, is a professor of violin at the Royal College of Music in London.

References

External links
 Alaska's Digital Archives - Photo of Chancy Croft while Senate President, taken September 7, 1976
 Chancy Croft at 100 Years of Alaska's Legislature

|-

1937 births
Alaska lawyers
Lawyers from Anchorage, Alaska
Living people
Democratic Party members of the Alaska House of Representatives
Politicians from Anchorage, Alaska
People from Jennings, Louisiana
People from Odessa, Texas
Presidents of the Alaska Senate
Democratic Party Alaska state senators
University of Alaska regents
University of Texas School of Law alumni